Muhammad Saleh bin Taher Benten is a Saudi politician who was appointed as the Minister of Hajj and Umrah by King Salman on 27 July 2016. He is of Indonesian descent, from his family name "Benten" which originates from the region of Banten, in western Java, his paternal grandma was from Banten.

Education
Benten received a doctorate in Computer Engineering from the University of Colorado Boulder, and a masters and bachelors in Electrical Engineering at King Fahd University.

Career
Before becoming Minister, Benten occupied numerous positions. He has been President of the Saudi Post Corporation, assistant deputy minister of Hajj, Deputy Minister of Hajj, and the Dean of Faculty of Computer and Engineering. Benten has published more than 100 scientific studies. 

Benten became President of the Saudi Post in 2004 where he oversaw restructuring of the organization. As Deputy Minister of Hajj and Umrah, Benten introduced the e-Umrah project, which facilitated Umrahmt for more than 5 million people.

Ministry

In 2018, Benten's ministry announced that Umrah performers who were foreigners were permitted to visit any city in Saudi Arabia, but they must spend 15 days of the 30-day Umrah stay visiting the two grand mosques in Mecca and Medina. In December 2018, Benten signed a bilateral agreement with the Indian Minister of Minority Affairs, Mukhtar Abbas Naqvi concerning the Hajj 2019.

Recognition
Benten won the best Middle East Technical Manager 2002 award and the Best Director in the Middle East award.

References

Muhammad
living people
Year of birth missing (living people)
Saudi Arabian people of Indonesian descent